Bruceina chenoderma is a species of sea snail, a marine gastropod mollusk, in the family Calliostomatidae within the superfamily Trochoidea, the top snails, turban snails and their allies.

Distribution
This marine species occurs off South Africa.

References

 Özdikmen H. (2013) Substitute names for three preoccupied generic names in Gastropoda. Munis Entomology & Zoology 8(1): 252-256

Endemic fauna of South Africa
Calliostomatidae